is a retired Japanese professional pitcher.

External links

Living people
1978 births
Baseball people from Yamagata Prefecture
Tokyo Gakugei University alumni
Japanese baseball players
Nippon Professional Baseball pitchers
Yokohama BayStars players
Hokkaido Nippon-Ham Fighters players
Japanese baseball coaches
Nippon Professional Baseball coaches